Bethlehem ( Bet Lehem) is a 2013 Israeli drama film directed by Yuval Adler. It was screened at the Venice Days section of the 2013 Venice Film Festival where it won the top prize. It was shown at the Telluride Film Festival and 2013 Toronto International Film Festival. The film was selected as the Israeli entry for the Best Foreign Language Film at the 86th Academy Awards after winning six Ophir Awards including Best Screenplay, Best Director and Best Film, but it was not nominated.

Cast
 Tzachi Halevy as Razi
  as Sanfur
 Hitham Omari as Badawi
  as Einat
 Tarik Kopty as Abu Ibrahim
 George Iskandar as Nasser
 Hisham Sulliman as Ibrahim

Development
The screenplay was written by Yuval Adler and Ali Waked from 2007 through 2010. The script went through multiple drafts and was heavily influenced by research that the two conducted concomitantly to writing it, interviewing both Israeli Shin Bet operatives and Palestinian militants from Al-Aqsa Martyrs' Brigades and Hamas. At the time of writing the screenplay, Ali Waked was a correspondent for Ynet covering Palestinian affairs.  Many incidents described in the film were directly influenced by actual events from the period. In 2010, the screenplay was included in the Berlinale co-production market which helped attach Belgian producers Entre Chien et Loup and German producers Gringo Films to the film. In January 2011, the Israeli Film Fund and the Jerusalem Film Funds gave their support to the project. English sales agent WestEnd picked up the film.

The casting process took almost a year. The three lead actors in the film, Shadi Mar’i who plays Sanfur, Tsahi Halevi who plays Razi and Hitham Omari who plays Badawi, were non-professionals who had never acted in a film before. Omari, a Palestinian from Kafr 'Aqab, was discovered accidentally during a location scout. Halevi was discovered just weeks before filming began; he was an aspiring singer who had just finished appearing on the first season of Israeli singing competition show The Voice Israel, where he had reached the final four. Mar'i, who was not even 17 at the time of the shoot, was discovered after hundreds of teenagers were auditioned. Many of the extras and bit players (both Israelis and Palestinians) were reenacting in the film scenes they experienced in their own lives.

Filming
The film was shot digitally on Arri Alexa. Principal photography began November 2011 and lasted 29 days. The film was shot in Jerusalem, Bethlehem, Ramla and Jaffa with a few additional days of reshoots in early 2012. Post production work was done in Belgium and Germany.

Reception
The Hollywood Reporter, "Israeli debutant director Yuval Adler finds tragic personal drama among the murderous power players of his troubled homeland."
The Telegraph, "There are few wise men in Yuval Adler's Israeli thriller, which screened as part of the Venice Film Festival, writes Robbie Collin."
Variety, "This tightly wound clock-ticking thriller examines the Arab-Israeli conflict to impressive effect." 
The New York Times, "The murky world of terrorism and counter-terrorism, and the vicious circle of suspicion and betrayal in which all the players are locked, are well drawn in this gritty, suspenseful drama as the action moves toward its inevitably violent denouement."
Haaretz, "yet another Israeli propaganda film", "an outrageous film", "the Israelis are the good guys, the Arabs the bad guys", "distortion and concealment", "abominable", "one-dimensional"; "refuses to sort everyone into good and bad";"hits high notes but fails to transcend entertainment value."
Al Monitor, "skillfully depicts relationships where empathy and exploitation, intimacy and instrumentalization are mixed together."
Thedailybeast, "Brings the Occupation Back Into Our Homes."

See also
 List of submissions to the 86th Academy Awards for Best Foreign Language Film
 List of Israeli submissions for the Academy Award for Best Foreign Language Film

References

External links
 

2013 films
2013 drama films
Israeli drama films
2010s Hebrew-language films
Shin Bet in fiction